Yoon Chan (born November 26, 1996) is a South Korean actor. He began his career as a child actor.

Filmography

Films

Television series

References

External links 
 
 
 
 

1996 births
Living people
South Korean male child actors
South Korean male television actors
South Korean male film actors